Cophocerotis is a monotypic moth genus in the family Geometridae described by Warren in 1895. Its only species, Cophocerotis jaspeata, was first described by Paul Dognin in 1893. It is found in Ecuador.

References

Larentiinae
Monotypic moth genera